The Immigration Ordinance is Chapter 115 of Hong Kong's Ordinances. It regulates the immigration issues of Hong Kong, such as Right of Abode, immigration control and enforcement of illegal immigration by Immigration Department.

Introduced in 1971 (as Cap 55), it replaced a number of earlier ordinances that dealt with immigration control from China into Hong Kong:

 Passport Ordinance 1923
 Travellers' Restriction Ordinance 1915
 Registration of Persons Ordinance 1916 - amended 1935
 Immigration Control Ordinance 1940; 1949
 Deportation Ordinance 1917
 Immigration and Passport Ordinance 1934

The previous ordinances reflected the flow of immigration prior to establishment of the People's Republic of China in 1949 which resulted in a large movement of immigrants and illegal immigration from then onwards.

This ordinance is often cited in controversial policies and the restrictive nature of immigration in Hong Kong, especially in regards to right of abode to non-Chinese immigrants after amendments in 1987 to deal with post-handover Hong Kong.

See also
 Hong Kong Identity Card
 Immigration Service Ordinance
 Visa policy of Hong Kong
 Immigration Act 1971 - passed in the United Kingdom at the same time as Hong Kong's ordinance and also dealt with right of abode
 Immigration and Refugee Protection Act (Canada)
 Immigration and Nationality Act of 1965

References

External links

External Reference
 Inland Revenue Ordinance Cap.112 (online)

Hong Kong legislation
Immigration law in Hong Kong
Immigration legislation